Isaac Donnom Witherspoon (1803 - 1858) was a politician in South Carolina.

He served in the state house and then the state senate. He succeeded William K. Clowney as lieutenant governor and served from December 1842 until December 1844. He was succeeded by J. F. Ervin.

His brother James Witherspoon Sr. Also served as Lieutenant governor as did James Hervey Witherspoon Jr.

He died of a stroke.

See also
List of lieutenant governors of South Carolina

References

1803 births
1858 deaths
Members of the South Carolina House of Representatives
South Carolina state senators
Lieutenant Governors of South Carolina